Deh Barm is a village in Ahmadabad Rural District, in the Central District of Firuzabad County, Fars Province, Iran. At the 2006 census, its population was 839, in 170 families.

References 

Populated places in Firuzabad County